Europium(III) hydroxide is an inorganic compound with a chemical formula Eu(OH)3.

Chemical properties
Europium(III) hydroxide can be prepared by reacting metallic europium with water. It reacts with acids and produces europium(III) salts:
 Eu(OH)3 + 3 H+ → Eu3+ + 3 H2O

Europium(III) hydroxide decomposes to EuO(OH) at elevated temperature. Further decomposition produces Eu2O3.

References

Europium(III) compounds
Hydroxides